Mmoh is a surname. Notable people with the surname include:

 Michael Mmoh (born 1998), Saudi Arabian-born American tennis player, son of Tony
 Tony Mmoh (born 1958), Nigerian tennis player